The Complete Strawbs is a live album by English band Strawbs. It was recorded in 1998 at their 30th anniversary concert at Chiswick House. The concert was also filmed and later was released on DVD. More than four different incarnations of the band performed. Wherever possible, the tracks were performed by the original musicians, although there were exceptions. Keyboard players John Hawken, Andy Richards and Rick Wakeman were unable to attend, but Wakeman's son Adam deputised for them. Original bass player Ron Chesterman and one-time drummer Tony Fernandez were present at the concert but did not perform.

Track listing

All tracks written by Dave Cousins except where stated

CD

"Further Down the Road"
"Grace Darling"
"Ringing Down the Years"
"Beside the Rio Grande"
"Out in the Cold"
"Round and Round"
"Hero and Heroine"
"Witchwood"
"A Glimpse of Heaven"
"Josephine for Better or for Worse"
"Oh How She Changed" (Cousins, Tony Hooper)
"New World"
"The River"
"Down by the Sea"
"Part of the Union" (Richard Hudson, John Ford)

DVD

The DVD listing is the same as the CD listing up to and including track 11. Thereafter the following tracks appear: -

<li>"New World"
<li>"Stormy Down"
<li>"Part of the Union" (Hudson, Ford)
<li>"The River"
<li>"Down by the Sea"

The DVD contains the following bonus features:

Blue Angel – the 1990s band
Dave Cousins Remembers – Dave Cousins' recollections of the day
Strawbs in Tokyo '75 – a preview

Personnel

Track numbers refer to the CD listing

Dave Cousins – vocals, acoustic guitar, dulcimer (all tracks)
Tony Hooper – vocals, acoustic guitar (tracks 8–11)
Dave Lambert – vocals, electric guitar (tracks 4–7, 12–15)
Brian Willoughby – guitar (tracks 1–3, 7–11, 14)
John Ford – bass guitar, vocals (tracks 8–15)
Chas Cronk – bass guitar, vocals (tracks 4–7)
Rod Demick – bass guitar, vocals (tracks 1–3)
Blue Weaver – keyboards (tracks 1–3, 8–15)
Richard Hudson – drums, vocals (tracks 1–3, 8–15)
Rod Coombes – drums, vocals (tracks 4–7)

Additional personnel
Cathryn Craig – vocals (track 1)
Ric Sanders – violin (tracks 3, 7)
Adam Wakeman – keyboards (tracks 2 – 7, 14)

Release history

References
The Complete Strawbs on Strawbsweb

2000 live albums
Live video albums
2002 video albums
2002 live albums
Strawbs live albums
Strawbs video albums